The 2023 Mount Olive Trojans men's volleyball team represents Mount Olive College in the 2023 NCAA Division I & II men's volleyball season. The Trojans, led by first year head coach Omar Sanchez, were picked to finish third the Conference Carolinas title in the coaches preseason poll.

Season highlights
Will be filled in as the season progresses.

Roster

Schedule
TV/Internet Streaming information:
All home games will be streamed on Conference Carolinas DN. Most road games will also be televised or streamed by the schools television or streaming service.

 *-Indicates conference match.
 Times listed are Eastern Time Zone.

Announcers for televised games
Tusculum: Brian Stayton
Lincoln Memorial: Adam Haley & Katherine Bedel
Merrimack: Michael Deleo
Morehouse: 
Ft. Valley State: 
Belmont Abbey:
North Grenville: 
Queens: 
Emmanuel: 
Erskine: 
Barton: 
King: 
Lees-McRae: 
Charleston (WV): 
Charleston (WV): 
Erskine: 
Emmanuel: 
North Greenville: 
Belmont Abbey: 
Lees-McRae: 
King: 
Queens:
Lincoln Memorial: 
Tusculum: 
Barton:

References

2023 in sports in North Carolina
2023 NCAA Division I & II men's volleyball season
Mount Olive